Mbondjanga is a village in the commune of Bankim in the Adamawa Region of Cameroon, near the

Population 
In 1967, Mbondjanga comptait 94 inhabitants, mainly Kondja.

At the time of the 2005 census, there were 1043 people in the village.

References

Bibliography 
 Jean Boutrais, 1993, Peuples et cultures de l'Adamaoua (Cameroun) : actes du colloque de Ngaoundéré du 14 au 16 janvier 1992, Paris : Éd. de l'ORSTOM u.a.
 Dictionnaire des villages de l'Adamaoua, ONAREST, Yaoundé, October 1974, 133 p.

External links 
 Bankim in brief

Populated places in Adamawa Region